Thomas Cooper (9 April 1905 – 25 June 1940) was an England international footballer who played for Port Vale, Derby County, and Liverpool. He won 15 caps, and played 430 league games in a 16-year career in the Football League. He helped Derby to finish second in the Second Division in 1925–26 and second in the First Division in 1929–30.

Early and personal life
Thomas Cooper was born on 9 April 1905 in Fenton, Staffordshire. He was the seventh of eight children to Stephen James and Sarah Ann (née Shorthouse); his father worked as a bricklayer. He worked as a haulage hand at the coalmine. He married Beatrice Jean Raynor in June 1931; they had two children.

Playing career

Port Vale
Cooper played for Longton and then Trentham, before being bought by Port Vale for a fee of £20 in August 1924. He played 21 Second Division matches in the 1924–25 season, but featured just 11 times in the 1925–26 campaign.

Derby County
Cooper was sold to George Jobey's Derby County for a £2,500 fee in March 1926. He settled straight into the "Rams" line-up and became an integral member of the team that secured promotion out of the Second Division with a second-place finish in 1925–26. County went on to finish 12th in the First Division in 1926–27, before rising to fourth place in 1927–28. After a sixth-place finish in 1928–29, County finished second in the league in 1929–30 – though they ended up some ten points behind champions The Wednesday. In December 1930, Newcastle United had a bid for Cooper rejected. Derby secured a sixth-place finish again in 1930–31. Cooper was made skipper at the Baseball Ground in 1931, and led the club to 15th in 1931–32, seventh in 1932–33, and fourth again in 1933–34.

Liverpool
After 267 appearances for Derby, Liverpool manager George Patterson secured his services for a £7,500 fee in December 1934. He immediately made his debut on 8 December in an away fixture at Stamford Bridge; Chelsea spoilt the day for Cooper by humbling the "Reds" 4–1. Cooper failed to hit the target for his new club (after only scoring once for Derby) although he was an excellent defender who was one of the toughest tacklers in the game. He wasn't just a stopper, his passing was of the highest order. His Anfield career was pretty much the same as his Derby days, as he became a regular starter from day one, he missed just two of the remaining fixtures of the 1934–35 season and featured in 127 of the 168 games over the following four campaigns. Liverpool finished just two places and three points above the relegation zone in 1935–36, and rose just one place in 1936–37. The club then posted 11th-place finishes in 1937–38 and 1938–39.

His last competitive game was a league game at Anfield, Chelsea were the visitors and the "Reds" won 1–0 with a goal from débutante Cyril Done. The league was then called to a halt because of the war, with regional leagues being set up around the country. Cooper's last match in a red shirt was at Gresty Road on 22 March 1940 in a 6–3 victory over Crewe Alexandra in the Western Division. Cooper also played for Wrexham as a wartime guest.

International career
The Football Association saw his quality at Derby and selected him to represent England 15 times. His first cap came on 22 October 1927 in a British Home Championship match at Windsor Park Belfast; Northern Ireland were the hosts and won the game 2–0. Cooper was given the ultimate honour of captaining his country twice in his last two appearances for England; the first time was against Czechoslovakia on 16 May 1934; the Czechs won the game 2–1. He would surely have been selected to play even more representative matches had it not been for injuries, including having both knee cartilages removed.

Death
Cooper enlisted in the armed forces in World War II, joining the Royal Military Police. In June 1940, Cooper was out on his despatch motorcycle when he collided with a lorry; he died in the accident. An inquiry took place into his death with the outcome being an order that stated despatch riders were no longer allowed to ride their motorcycles without wearing a crash helmet. His six pallbearers were Sammy Crooks, Harry Bedford, George Collin, Douglas Duncan, Tom Davison and George Stevenson, all former Derby County clubmates.

Career statistics
Source:

Honours
Derby County
Football League Second Division second-place promotion: 1925–26

England
British Home Championship: 1931–32, 1934–35 (shared)

See also
 List of footballers killed during World War II

References

1905 births
1940 deaths
Military personnel from Staffordshire
People from Fenton, Staffordshire
English footballers
Association football fullbacks
Port Vale F.C. players
Derby County F.C. players
Liverpool F.C. players
Liverpool F.C. wartime guest players
Wrexham F.C. wartime guest players
English Football League players
English Football League representative players
England international footballers
Royal Military Police soldiers
Road incident deaths in England
British Army personnel killed in World War II